Marc Jay Turtletaub (born January 30, 1946) is an American film producer and former president and CEO of The Money Store.

Early life and education
Born in Lakewood, New Jersey, he grew up in Perth Amboy, New Jersey and the adjoining township of Woodbridge.  He attended Rutgers Preparatory School, graduating in the class of 1963. The captain and a center on the basketball team, he made All-State in his senior year and was inducted into the Rutgers Prep Athletic Hall of Fame in 1993. At the time of his induction he was called a "class individual" by the former basketball coach.  He was a political science major at the Wharton School of the University of Pennsylvania, graduating in 1967.  He was a reporter and then managing editor of the campus newspaper, The Daily Pennsylvanian. He received a "Men's Senior Honor Award" for "outstanding service to the University community" and was selected to be a member of  the prestigious Sphinx Senior Society.   He attended New York University School of Law, graduating in 1970.  He was admitted to the California Bar, becoming inactive in 2013. He was journalist for six years after finishing school, but always felt he was a storyteller.

The Money Store

Turtletaub worked for 20 years at The Money Store, a company founded by his father,  Alan Turtletaub, in 1967. The Money Store was a pioneer in the subprime lending industry, making home equity secured second mortgage and other loans to people with blemished credit.  Turtletaub succeeded his father as CEO and president in 1989, and, took the company public in 1991, then sold it in June 1998 to First Union Bank for $2.1 billion. During his tenure the advertising-driven lending company's growth was phenomenal, and "had been quite profitable for the Turtletaub family."  At the time of the sale, revenue was $831 million/year, loan originations were more than $1 billion a quarter, there were 172 branches and 5000 employees; it was the nation's 5th-largest subprime lender, and the leading home equity and Small Business Administration lender. Turtletaub had built a  ziggurat shaped headquarter in West Sacramento, triggering a rebirth in the area. He subscribed to the ancient principles of feng shui, a Chinese geometric practice; with architect Ed Kado, he incorporated these features into the design of this "unique landmark." The need for a "deep pocket" had led to the merger; bond rating agencies had downgraded The Money Store to junk bond status.  Within a day of the merger it had a solid rating.  "We will now benefit from the rating of the parent company. We are going to be in the driver's seat," Turtletaub said.   First Union had trouble integrating acquisitions, and The Money Store did not prosper after the merger. At the time of the severe liquidity crisis of August 1998, the subprime industry imploded. The main source of funds to replenish capital and to refinance new loans, securitization, dried up. Also, the parent company revamped many of the advertising programs that had made the company so previously successful; the Money Store was soon described as barely existing in the form that it was bought in. Turtletaub resigned as president and CEO in May, 1999.  By October, 1999, the deal was called a "disaster" for First Union.  First Union, preparing for a Wachovia merger, split The Money Store into four divisions, and transferred First Union's bad home equity loans into The Money Store's home equity division. The student loan division, Educaid, and the SBA loan division were retained by First Union. 

Turtletaub was a "generous donator" to federally elected officials; a friend of President Bill Clinton (FOB), he got to sleep in the Lincoln bedroom, and had a private "coffee visit" with President Clinton and Senator Chris Dodd, then chairman of the Senate Banking Committee.
The Money Store's use of political donations and lobbyists was described as the "classic example of the interaction of money, politics and regulation."  Competitors felt that The Money Store was treated more favorably because of its political clout, with accusations that federal rulings in its favor were "politically fixed."

The Money Store was closed in July, 2000, at a loss of $1.7 billion to First Union Bank Corp.

Producer
With a profit of $700 million from selling The Money Store, Turtletaub decided to go into the film business. He describes himself as a child of the counter-culture and only wants to make films he is passionate about and that have redemption, something more than entertainment. He wants to touch and change people and use his money, through film, to do good. He looks for movies that have "something that touches my heart," have a powerful voice, illuminate the human condition and emotional connections, and are either life-affirming in some way, or life-revealing. He prefers script writers and directors who are doing their first films, as he is looking for a fresh perspective. Turtletaub's approach to filmmaking has been described as always "more idealistic than opportunistic." Before entering the film world, Turtletaub spent almost a year meeting people in the film industry. He used the instincts he developed as a reporter to ask questions and learn the craft of filmmaking. In 2000 he teamed with producer David Friendly, forming Deep River Productions. The original plan was to use Turtletaub's resources to buy material to develop, then taking the properties to the studios for production. Several movies were produced by Deep River, most notably Little Miss Sunshine, a 2006 Academy Award nominee for best picture. Turtletaub originally bought Michael Arndt's repeatedly rejected script for $250,000, repurchased it two years later for $400,000 and then paid the $8 million costs of production. The film was a box-office success and critically acclaimed. Friendly and Turtletaub split after a six-year run. He joined with Peter Saraf in 2004 to form Big Beach Films, with Turtletaub realizing the "need to specialize." He describes himself and Saraf as creative producers, involved in every stage of the filmmaking, from the original idea through the editing process. They have produced over 20 movies, and, are best known for lower budget comedy-drama films, such as Little Miss Sunshine and Safety Not Guaranteed. Safety Not Guaranteed has been called "one of the most influential films of the last decade." Made in 2012 with a first-time director and writer and costing less than a million dollars, this character driven indie caught the eye of Netflix, foreshadowing the role of streaming in film creation and distribution. Turtletaub produced the 2019 Sundance breakout The Farewell starring Awkwafina. Critically and financially successful, The Farewell has been called a groundbreaking work for bringing a broad based Asian-American narrative to Hollywood, allowing members of the community "to see their own experiences and their own stories on the screen." Another 2019 release was Marielle Heller's biographical film A Beautiful Day in the Neighborhood, with Tom Hanks portraying Mr. Rogers. The scripted drama premiered at the 2019 Toronto International Film Festival; it had made the 2013 Black List of the best unproduced screenplays. The story about a man dedicated to radical kindness has been viewed as a politically trenchant movie of the Trump era. These two 2019 releases have been described as humanistic and life affirming. The Farewell won the 2019 Spirit Award for best independent feature; and, the two films were nominated for a total of three Golden Globe awards and one Academy Award. Turtletaub commented: "We have specific taste. People want to see stories that touch their heart. That's hard to define." Documentary productions include Seed: The Untold Story, earning him an Emmy nomination for Outstanding Nature Documentary; Sheila Nevins and Davy Rothbart's 17 Blocks, the winner of multiple film festival awards; and, an as yet untitled Led Zeppelin feature, told in their own voices for the first time.

In 2014 Turtletaub started a TV division, Big Beach TV, which works closely with his L.A. affiliate, Beachside, focusing on micro-budget features and digital content. Through Big Beach TV, Turtletaub has produced the Starz drama Vida and Elizabeth Olsen's "engrossing" Sorry for Your Loss. Vida has been described as groundbreaking; it has the first all-Latinx writers room on TV, with several queer writers and all but one writer identifying as female. It has created "a safe space for stories regarding Latinx and freedom of sexual identity." A critical and ratings success, it has allowed the Mexican-American and queer "communities to feel recognized in a way that the vast majority of television does not." In 2021 Vida received an Imagen nomination for Best Primetime Program – Comedy.  Turtletaub was executive producer of the filmed version of the Obie and New York Drama Critics' Circle award-winning  Broadway play What the Constitution Means to Me, starring Heidi Schreck. It began streaming on Amazon Prime October 16, 2020. The production has been described as a "flashing catastrophe alert." In 2021 Turtletaub, along with Alex Turtletaub and Saraf, was an executive producer of the IDA Award nominee  HBO documentary series Nuclear Family; Big Beach was one of the production companies.

In February, 2022, Big Beach closed its New York office and laid off an unknown number of staff, including from the Los Angeles-based site.  Saraf had already "quietly" left Big Beach in 2021.  The cuts have been described as a sign of the difficulty facing indie filmmakers, "even those with awards pedigree and decades of survival."

His theatrical producing debut was in 2009, the Off-Broadway Sleepwalk with Me. Broadway productions include the revivals of Of Mice and Men, Sylvia, Burn This (2019) and Les Liaisons Dangereuses.

Director
Turtletaub is a director of three films. In 2011 he directed Gods Behaving Badly, a film adaption of the 2007  satirical novel of the same name. The film was never released, and played only once, at the 2013 Rome Film Festival, where it received negative reviews. He directed the 2018 film Puzzle, an English-language remake of the 2010 Argentinian film. Described as a lovely, gentle movie, it received generally excellent reviews with a Rotten Tomatoes rating of 83%. It has been credited as having "broken a glass ceiling" when it had an Asian Indian, Irfan Khan, as a romantic lead in an American film.  Puzzle was chosen to open the 2018 Edinburgh Film Festival. This was Khan's last role in an American movie, as the acclaimed actor died shortly later.   Turtletaub was motivated to direct Puzzle for a personal reason. Puzzle was dedicated to his mother, Beatrice Ann Turtletaub. "It’s a story about a woman who’s a mother and a wife living in suburban Connecticut, doting on her husband and her sons. And I knew that woman – it was my mother. I grew up in suburban New Jersey, and she doted on my dad and me. When I read [the screenplay], I felt like it was a story I could tell."
He is directing (and producing) Jules, a movie starring Ben Kingsley and Jane Curtin. Filming started September 10, 2021, in Boonton, New Jersey. It is about an unusual visitor to a small western Pennsylvania town. It will premier at the 2023 Sundance Film Festival.

Marie Phillips, the author of the novel Gods Behaving Badly, described Turtletaub on-set as genial, good-natured and friendly. His style is radical and unique; he does no rehearsals, and, allows the "actors free to bring in what they can bring in." He only does a few takes, at most, which he feels allows "something fresh to come in," not necessarily his original vision.

Personal life
Turtletaub has two sons  and is married to Maureen Curran-Turtletaub, a movement educator for over 30 years and founder and director of Movement as a Path for Transformation.   Described as "prominent Sacramento philanthropists," they established Meristem in 2015 on 13 "bucolic" acres near the American River. Associated with a teacher training college and inspired by and using John Ruskin's "craft and land" philosophy of education, Meristem educates young adults with ASD and other developmental differences, transitioning them so they will better succeed as adults in an evolving post-industrial society. He has remained politically active since leaving The Money Store. He has supported Democratic candidates at many levels of office, from city to federal. In addition to Sacramento, since 2000 Turtletaub has had residences in Los Angeles, the West Village, Orcas Island, and Makena, Hawaii.

Filmography
He was a producer in all films unless otherwise noted.

Film

As director

As writer

As an actor

Thanks

Television

Awards
Independent Spirit Award for Best Film, 2006, Little Miss Sunshine
Producers Guild of America Award for Best Theatrical Motion Picture, 2006, Little Miss Sunshine
Producers Guild of America Award, 2016 - The Stanley Kramer Award,  Loving
Independent Spirit Award for Best Film, 2019, The Farewell

Notes

External links
 
 Six moviemaking tips from Marc Turtletaub

1946 births
Living people
Film producers from New Jersey
New York University School of Law alumni
People from Perth Amboy, New Jersey
People from Woodbridge Township, New Jersey
Rutgers Preparatory School alumni
Wharton School of the University of Pennsylvania alumni
The Daily Pennsylvanian people
American chief executives of financial services companies
American newspaper reporters and correspondents
California lawyers
People from Lakewood Township, New Jersey
Film directors from New Jersey
American independent film production company founders